David Denny (born February 5, 1948, Berkeley, California) is an American  rock guitar player who was a founding member of Frumious Bandersnatch, a seminal psychedelic rock band from 1960s San Francisco.  Denny was a member of the Steve Miller Band, playing on 1977's Book of Dreams, Greatest Hits 1974-1978 (released in 1978, sold over 13 million copies), and 1993's Wide River.  Denny wrote the hit song "The Stake," which was on the Book of Dreams and Greatest Hits 1974-1978 albums.  While running a Mission District studio during the late 1980s, Denny contributed his guitar and vocal talents as a founding member of the Bombay Crawlers and played several Bay Area gigs with the rock ensemble.  He later released two solo albums, 1991's Diesel Harmonics and 1997's Louisiana Melody. David Denny and his ex-wife Kathy Peck (Executive Director and Co-founder of H.E.A.R. and former bass player with The Contractions) are artists, songwriters, film score composers, and music publisher owners of Monima Music.

Discography

With Frumious Bandersnatch
1967 – Untitled EP; self-produced
1995 – The Berkeley EP's (compilation, 3 songs featured); Big Beat UK
1996 – A Young Man's Song; Big Beat UK
2003 – Golden Songs of Libra, Get Back
2007 – Love Is the Song We Sing: San Francisco Nuggets 1965-1970 (compilation, feat. "Hearts to Cry"); Rhino Records

With the Steve Miller Band
1977 – Book of Dreams; Eagle Records
1993 – Wide River; Polydor Records
1973-1978 – Greatest Hits 1974-1978 (Steve Miller Band album); Capitol Records

Solo
1991 – Diesel Harmonics; Six Degrees of Freedom
1997 – Louisiana Melody; Six Degrees of Freedom

Monima Music
2000 – David Denny and Carlos Reyes Live at Hyde Street; (David Denny and Carlos Reyes)
2014 – The Winds of Lyon; The Winds of Lyon (David Denny and Kathy Peck)
2014 – Passing By; The Winds of Lyon (David Denny and Kathy Peck)
2014 – Need A Lift; The Winds of Lyon (David Denny and Kathy Peck)

References

External links

 

1948 births
Living people
American rock guitarists
American male guitarists
Musicians from Berkeley, California
Guitarists from California
Steve Miller Band members
Frumious Bandersnatch members
20th-century American guitarists
20th-century American male musicians